Lizards Like Us is a tribute album by The Section Quartet, commemorating the band's appearance at Coachella 2006.

Track listing
"Time is Running Out" - Muse
"London Calling" - The Clash
"Maps" - Yeah Yeah Yeahs
"Dynomite" - Ima Robot

Tribute albums
2006 albums
The Section Quartet albums